P. carvalhoi may refer to:
 Pipa carvalhoi, the Carvalho's Surinam toad, a frog species endemic to Brazil
 Pristimantis carvalhoi, B. Lutz in B. Lutz & Kloss, 1952, an amphibian species in the genus Pristimantis found in Brazil

See also
 Carvalhoi (disambiguation)